Igor Vasilyevich Paklin (born 15 June 1963 in Frunze, Kirghiz SSR) is a retired Kyrgyz athlete who represented USSR and later Kyrgyzstan. He trained at Armed Forces sports society in Frunze.

Competing in the high jump, he won the 1987 World Indoor Championships as well as a silver medal at the 1987 World Championships for the USSR. His leap of  places him as the fifth-highest jumper in history. Like all modern high jumpers, Paklin used the Fosbury Flop style, and he was the first to do so jumping off his right leg.

In 1996, Paklin was imprisoned for beating a business partner to death.

International competitions

References

External links
 
  (1988 Summer Olympics, competing for Soviet Union)
  (1992 Summer Olympics, competing for Unified Team)
 

1963 births
Living people
Kyrgyzstani high jumpers
Soviet male high jumpers
Olympic athletes of the Soviet Union
Olympic athletes of the Unified Team
Athletes (track and field) at the 1988 Summer Olympics
Athletes (track and field) at the 1992 Summer Olympics
World record setters in athletics (track and field)
Sportspeople from Bishkek
World Athletics Championships medalists
European Athletics Championships medalists
Male high jumpers
Kyrgyzstani male athletes
Universiade medalists in athletics (track and field)
Goodwill Games medalists in athletics
Athletes (track and field) at the 1994 Asian Games
Universiade gold medalists for the Soviet Union
Asian Games competitors for Kyrgyzstan
CIS Athletics Championships winners
Soviet Athletics Championships winners
World Athletics Indoor Championships winners
Medalists at the 1983 Summer Universiade
Medalists at the 1985 Summer Universiade
Competitors at the 1986 Goodwill Games